Automatic Press / VIP is an independent publishing house founded in 2005. It published interview books featuring prominent scholars and philosophers. Among the notables who have published interviews in are Nobel Prize Laureates Robert Aumann and Thomas Schelling, Bruno Latour, Martha Nussbaum, Peter Galison, Philip Petit, Bill McKibben, Susan Haack, Clark Nøren Glymour, Ariel Rubinstein, Colin Camerer, Solomon Feferman, John Bell, Timothy Williamson, Jaakko Hintikka, Johan van Benthem, Rohit Parikh, Krister Segerberg and others.  

In the three years of its existence, the press has published or plans to publish these volumes:
 Formal Philosophy, edited by Vincent F. Hendricks & John Symons, 2005.   (website)
 Masses of Formal Philosophy, edited by Vincent F. Hendricks & John Symons, December 2006. 
 Political Questions: 5 Questions on Political Philosophy, edited by Morten Ebbe Juul Nielsen, December 2006.  (website)
 Philosophy of Technology, edited by Jan-Kyrre Berg Olsen & Evan Selinger, February 2007.
 Game Theory: 5 Questions, edited by Vincent F. Hendricks & Pelle Guldborg Hansen, April 2007.
 Normative Ethics: 5 Questions, edited by Jesper Ryberg & Thomas S. Petersen.
 Philosophy of Mathematics: 5 Questions, edited by Vincent F. Hendricks & Hannes Leitgeb, June 2007.
 Legal Philosophy: 5 Questions, edited by Ian Farrell & Morten Ebbe Juul Nielsen, August 2007.
 Foundations and Philosophy of Physics: 5 Questions, edited by Juan Ferret & John Symons, February 2009
 Probability and Statistics: 5 Questions, edited by Alan Hájek & Vincent F. Hendricks, March 2008.
 Complexity: 5 Questions, edited by Carlos Gershenson, 2009.
 Signs and Meaning: 5 Questions, edited by Peer Bundgaard and Frederik Stjernfelt, 2009. (Includes interviews with 29 leading semioticians of the world.) 
 Thought 2 Talk: A Crash Course in Reflection and Expression, Vincent F. Hendricks, June 2006.

External links
 Automatic Press / VIP official site

Small press publishing companies
Publishing companies established in 2005